This is a list of songs about Cork, city and county, Ireland.

 "The Armoured Car" - about a famous greyhound owned by Con Doyle.
 "I Never Left Cork City"  A song about the love for Cork Ciy   Tim Martin O'Leary

 "The Blarney Stone" a song about getting the gift of the gab by Tim Martin O'Leary
 "In Cork" Funny Song by Tim Martin O'Leary
 "Macroom the town that never reared a fool"   Song by Tim Martin O'Leary
 "We love Kinsale" All about the battle of Kinsale in 1601   Song by Tim Martin O'Leary
 "The Liffey and the Lee" A man from Cork in love with a Dublin woman by: Tim Martin O'Leary 
 "Sophie" Song about an unsolved murder in West Cork  Song by Tim Martin O'Leary
 "Three Cheers for Ballymartle" a song about a winning hurling team from Ballymartle Club by Tim Martin O'Leary
 "This Thing's a loada ball's" A song about a west Cork Pyramid Scam by Tim Martin O'Leary
 "Pollution Man" a song about all the chemical companies in Cork by Tim Martin O'Leary
 "The Michael Buckley Song" a song about a champion accordion player in Cork by Tim Martin O'Leary
 "I believe in Santa Claus Tonight" an Irish Christmas song by Tim Martin O'Leary
 "An Poc ar Buile" (associated with the singer Seán Ó Sé)
 "The Banks of My Own Lovely Lee" - the Cork anthem
 "Beautiful City"
 "The Bold Christy Ring" - song about Cork hurler Christy Ring to the tune of Bold Thady Quill
 "Bold Thady Quill" - a Cork song written about 1895 by Johnny Tom Gleeson (1853–1924)
 "The Boys of Fairhill" - popular Cork song, original version by Con Doyle, recorded by Jimmy Crowley.
 "The Boys from Rebel Cork"
 "The Boys of Kilmichael" Song about the Kilmichael Ambush 28 November 1920
 "The Boys of Crossbarry" song about the Crossbarry Ambush 19 March 1921
 "The Boys of the County Cork" - written by Tom Murphy.
 "The Brave Fighting Men of Crossbarry", written by Tim O'Riordan.
 "City by the Lee"
 "Come up to Gurrane, Lizzie Windsor"- written by Tim O'Riordan of Natural Gas on the occasion of Queen Elizabeth II's visit to Ireland in 2011
 "Cottage by the Lee" - written by songwriter Dick Farrelly.
 "De Groves ov de Pool"
 "The Night the Goat Broke Loose on Grand Parade" - a Cork song from the 1930s, recorded by Dick Hogan (on Wonders of the World).
 "Johnny Don't go to Ballincollig" - written and recorded by John Spillane
 "Johnny Jump Up" - about a strong cider available during the war-time years, written by Tadgh Jordan in 1934, recorded by Jimmy Crowley.
 "The Lonely Woods of Upton" - ballad about the Upton Train Ambush, a hit for Seán Dunphy in 1969.
 "Lovely City by the Lee",1981. Written by David McCarthy, a.k.a.. Rocky Stone. Recorded by Billa O'Connell and John Bennet
 "Magic Nights in the Lobby Bar" - written and recorded by John Spillane
 " Old Red Jack" written by Tim O'Riordan about Seán Dearg Nash, an infamous character who lived at the mill in Brinny.
 "The Píobaire Bán", written by Tim O'Riordan- about the piper Peter Hagerty of Caheragh parish.
 "The Piper of Crossbarry", written by the Kerry writer, Bryan McMahon: air: Down by the Tanyard Side
 "Sailing to Barbary" written by Tim O'Riordan about the Sack of Baltimore.
 "Salonika" - there were two Cork songs with this title about the Irish serving in the British Army in the First World War, one for and one against. Jimmy Crowley collected the verses in his version from Mrs Ronayne of Cork.
 "A Song For Christy Ring" - another song about Cork hurler Christy Ring by Bryan MacMahon (writer) to the air of "Dear Old Skibbereen"
 "Song for Churchtown"
 "The Wild Bar-A-Boo" - song by Johnny Tom Gleeson about the Muskerry fox chase.
 "Skibbereen"
 "Youghal Harbour”
 “Rebels”

See also
 Music of Ireland

References

External links
 Jimmy Crowley web site

 
Irish styles of music
Cork
Cork
Cork